In July 2016, the International Union for Conservation of Nature (IUCN) listed 2178 vulnerable invertebrate species. Of all evaluated invertebrate species, 12% are listed as vulnerable. 
The IUCN also lists 47 invertebrate subspecies as vulnerable.

No subpopulations of invertebrates have been evaluated by the IUCN.

For a species to be assessed as vulnerable to extinction the best available evidence must meet quantitative criteria set by the IUCN designed to reflect "a high risk of extinction in the wild". Endangered and critically endangered species also meet the quantitative criteria of vulnerable species, and are listed separately. See: List of endangered invertebrates, List of critically endangered invertebrates. Vulnerable, endangered and critically endangered species are collectively referred to as threatened species by the IUCN.

Additionally 5278 invertebrate species (29% of those evaluated) are listed as data deficient, meaning there is insufficient information for a full assessment of conservation status. As these species typically have small distributions and/or populations, they are intrinsically likely to be threatened, according to the IUCN. While the category of data deficient indicates that no assessment of extinction risk has been made for the taxa, the IUCN notes that it may be appropriate to give them "the same degree of attention as threatened taxa, at least until their status can be assessed".

This is a complete list of vulnerable invertebrate species and subspecies as evaluated by the IUCN.

Nemertea species
Nightingale ribbon worm (Katechonemertes nightingaleensis)

Annelids
Giant Palouse earthworm (Driloleirus americanus)

Onychophora

Molluscs
There are 879 mollusc species and 18 mollusc subspecies assessed as vulnerable.

Gastropods
There are 828 gastropod species and 16 gastropod subspecies assessed as vulnerable.

Stylommatophora
Stylommatophora includes the majority of land snails and slugs. There are 339 species and six subspecies in the order Stylommatophora assessed as vulnerable.

Charopids

Helicarionids

Orthalicids

Euconulids

Streptaxids

Ferussaciids

Helminthoglyptids

Oxychilids

Camaenids

Lauriids

Vertiginids

Species

Subspecies
Anauchen informis informis
Anauchen informis parcedentata

Trissexodontids

Helicids

Species

Subspecies
Hemicycla glyceia silensis

Hygromiids

Species

Subspecies
Leptaxis simia portosancti

Vitrinids

Chondrinids

Enids

Other Stylommatophora

Species

Subspecies
Chlorilis hungerfordiana rufopila
Spelaeodiscus triarius tatricus

Littorinimorpha
There are 324 species and seven subspecies in the order Littorinimorpha assessed as vulnerable.

Hydrobiids
Species

Subspecies

Cochliopids

Bithyniids

Moitessieriids

Assimineids

Pomatiopsids

Amnicolids

Other Littorinimorpha species

Sorbeoconcha
There are 55 species in the order Sorbeoconcha assessed as vulnerable.

Pleurocerids

Melanopsids
Esperiana sangarica
Melanopsis subgraellsiana

Thiarids

Pachychilids

Paludomids

Architaenioglossa
Species

Subspecies
Renea moutonii moutonii
Renea moutonii singularis

Lower Heterobranchia species

Cycloneritimorpha

Hygrophila

Species

Subspecies
Gyraulus connollyi exilis

Neogastropoda
There are 27 species in the order Neogastropoda assessed as vulnerable.

Conids

Eupulmonata
Zospeum biscaiense
Zospeum exiguum

Bivalvia
There are 49 species and two subspecies in the class Bivalvia assessed as vulnerable.

Unionida
There are 37 species and two subspecies in the order Unionoida assessed as vulnerable.

Margaritiferids
Margaritifera middendorffi

Unionids
Species

Subspecies
Lampsilis reeviana reeviana

Hyriids

Iridinids
Species

Subspecies
Chambardia wahlbergi guillaini

Mycetopodids
Diplodontites olssoni

Cardiida

Arcida
Scaphula nagarjunai

Venerida

Cephalopods
Opisthoteuthis calypso
Opisthoteuthis massyae

Cnidaria
There are 203 species in the phylum Cnidaria assessed as vulnerable.

Hydrozoa
Millepora foveolata
Millepora latifolia

Anthozoa
There are 202 species in the class Anthozoa assessed as vulnerable.

Scleractinia
There are 199 species in the order Scleractinia assessed as vulnerable.

Euphyllids

Dendrophylliids

Acroporids

Poritids

Brain corals

Pocilloporids

Mussids

Pectiniids

Agariciids

Fungiids

Other Scleractinia species

Other Anthozoa species

Arthropods
There are 1080 arthropod species and 29 arthropod subspecies assessed as vulnerable.

Seed shrimps

Arachnids
There are 47 arachnid species assessed as vulnerable.

Spiders

Other arachnid species

Branchiopoda

Millipedes

Maxillopoda
Maxillopoda includes barnacles, copepods and a number of related animals. There are 71 species in the class Maxillopoda assessed as vulnerable.

Calanoida
There are 47 species in the order Calanoida assessed as vulnerable.

Diaptomids

Centropagids

Temorids
Epischura baikalensis

Cyclopoida

Harpacticoida
There are 18 species in the order Harpacticoida assessed as vulnerable.

Darcythompsoniids
Leptocaris stromatolicolus

Ameirids
Nitocrella slovenica
Nitocrella stochi

Canthocamptids

Malacostracans
Malacostraca includes crabs, lobsters, crayfish, shrimp, krill, woodlice, and many others. There are 307 malacostracan species and 14 malacostracan subspecies assessed as vulnerable.

Isopods
Species

Subspecies

Amphipods
There are 56 amphipod species and four amphipod subspecies assessed as vulnerable.

Hadziids
Subspecies
Hadzia fragilis stochi

Paramelitids
Paramelita flexa

Gammarids

Crangonyctids

Niphargids
Species

Subspecies

Anaspidacea

Decapods
There are 224 decapod species and seven decapod subspecies assessed as vulnerable.

Parastacids

Gecarcinucids

Atyids

Cambarids
Species

Subspecies

Potamonautids

Pseudothelphusids

Potamids

Palaemonids

Trichodactylids

Other decapod species

Insects
There are 608 insect species and 15 insect subspecies assessed as vulnerable.

Flies

Plecoptera
Otway stonefly (Eusthenia nothofagi)
Mount Kosciusko wingless stonefly (Leptoperla cacuminis)

Notoptera
Mount St Helens' grylloblattid (Grylloblatta chirurgica)

Orthoptera
There are 137 species in the order Orthoptera assessed as vulnerable.

Crickets

Acridids

Stenopelmatids

Tettigoniids

Rhaphidophorids

Phaneropterids

Other Orthoptera species

Hymenoptera
There are 155 species in the order Hymenoptera assessed as vulnerable.

Ants

Colletids

Melittids
Melitta hispanica
Melitta kastiliensis

Apids

Megachilids
Wallace's giant bee (Megachile pluto)

Mantises

Lepidoptera
Lepidoptera comprises moths and butterflies. There are 128 species and ten subspecies in the order Lepidoptera assessed as vulnerable.

Lasiocampids
Small lappet moth (Phyllodesma ilicifolia)

Swallowtail butterflies

Lycaenids

Nymphalids
Species

Subspecies

Skippers
Dakota skipper (Hesperia dacotae)
Cinquefoil skipper (Pyrgus cirsii)

Pierids

Beetles
There are 50 beetle species assessed as vulnerable.

Dytiscids

Longhorn beetles

Scarabaeids

Other beetle species

Odonata
Odonata includes dragonflies and damselflies. There are 129 species and five subspecies in the order Odonata assessed as vulnerable.

Chlorogomphids

Chlorocyphids

Platycnemidids

Megapodagrionids

Gomphids
Species

Subspecies
Erpetogomphus lampropeltis lampropeltis

Coenagrionids
Species

Subspecies

Aeshnids

Libellulids

Other Odonata species

Other arthropod species

Echinoderms

See also 
 Lists of IUCN Red List vulnerable species
 List of least concern invertebrates
 List of near threatened invertebrates
 List of endangered invertebrates
 List of critically endangered invertebrates
 List of recently extinct invertebrates
 List of data deficient invertebrates
Cernuellopsis

References 

Invertebrates
Vulnerable invertebrates